State Route 335 (SR 335) is a north–south state highway in the southern portion of the U.S. state of Ohio.

Route description
Along the way, it intersects with SR 139 in Minford and SR 776 near Stockdale.  It crosses SR 32 and SR 124 near Beaver.

History
SR 335 was commissioned in 1932, on it current route between Minford and Beaver. The highway was extended to Waverly in 1937. In 1939, the route was extended south to Portsmouth.

In 2003, the Ohio Department of Transportation (ODOT) commenced construction on a $1.8 million project to realign SR 335 from Dixon Mill Road to Gampp Lane in Scioto County east of the CSX railroad line. The realignment project was completed in May 2005.

Major intersections

References

335
Transportation in Scioto County, Ohio
Transportation in Pike County, Ohio